Xhesika Berberi is an Albanian model and beauty pageant titleholder, who was crowned Miss Universe Albania 2011 and represented Albania at the Miss Universe 2011.

Career
Berberi was crowned Miss Universe Albania 2011 and represented Albania at the Miss Universe 2011.

Later she started her career in the United States. Berberi is one of the Albanian models that is affecting success in the American market.
She is one of the images of Sherri Hill, where together with Adrola Dushi they turned into two iconic models.

After the Albanian earthquake in 2019, she contributed financially to the affected families.

References

1991 births
Living people
Albanian beauty pageant winners
Miss Universe 2011 contestants
People from Tirana